Milam Ridge is a ridge in the U.S. state of West Virginia.

Milam Ridge most likely was named after one Mr. Milam, a pioneer settler.

References

Landforms of Wyoming County, West Virginia
Ridges of West Virginia